"I Thought About You" is a 1939 popular song composed by Jimmy Van Heusen with lyrics by Johnny Mercer.

I Thought About You may also refer to:

 I Thought About You (Shirley Horn album), 1987
 I Thought About You (Eliane Elias album)
 I Thought About You (film), a 1997 Japanese film